Brann Timothy Dailor  (born March 19, 1975) is an American musician, best known as a member of heavy metal band Mastodon, in which he is the drummer and one of three vocalists.

Career 

Dailor first started playing in a band called Evisceration from 1991 to 1993, when the band broke up. Dailor was also a founding member of mathcore band Lethargy, and the progressive rock/funk metal band Gaylord and played with Today Is the Day.

In 2015, Dailor announced his side project called Arcadea. The group features Dailor on drums alongside Atlanta musicians Core Atoms and Raheem Amlani.

Dailor, Bill Kelliher, and Brent Hinds portrayed "wildlings" on S05E08 episode of Game of Thrones, which was filmed in Belfast in Northern Ireland. As previously reported, the band's original song "White Walker" is featured on the Game of Thrones mixtape Catch the Throne Vol. 2, but in the instance of their physical appearance, a press release from Reprise Records reports that the band was personally invited to participate in the show by Game of Thrones executive producer Dan Weiss, who is a fan of the band.

Dailor appeared in a balloon suit from OppoSuits at the 2015 Grammys. Together with Brent Hinds who sported a full Dodgers outfit they made several headlines.

Dailor appeared on a 2018 episode of the History Channel reality show Counting Cars called "Heavy Metal Caddy" in which he had his 1970 Cadillac Coupe DeVille restored. He calls his car "Twinkle Toes".

Influences 
Dailor's main influence is Phil Collins of Genesis in its 1970s era. He said that watching Sean Reinert with progressive metal band Cynic opened his eyes as a teen about the possibilities of technical drumming. He is also inspired by Mikkey Dee, Dave Lombardo, Elvin Jones, Tony Williams, Billy Cobham, Bill Bruford, Stevie Wonder and Dave Witte. Dailor's metal bands before Mastodon, Lethargy and Gaylord, were both heavily influenced by avant-garde rock group Mr. Bungle.

Equipment 

Dailor uses and endorses Tama drums and hardware, Meinl cymbals, Evans Drumheads, and Vater drumsticks.

Current kit 
Drums – Tama Starclassic Performer B/B
22x18 Bass Drum
10x8 Tom
12x9 Tom
13x10 Tom
16x16 Floor Tom
14x6 Starphonic Brass Snare Drum
Cymbals – Meinl
14" Mb20 Heavy Soundwave Hi-Hat
18" Mb20 Heavy Crash
20" Mb20 Heavy Crash
8" Classics Medium Bell
21" Mb8 Ghost Ride
Drumheads – Evans
Bass: EQ3 Clear – EQ3 Reso Black
Toms: G2 Clear – G1 Clear
Snare: Power Center Snare Batter – 300 Snare Side
Hardware – Tama
Tama Speed Cobra Double Bass Pedal
Tama Iron Cobra Lever-Glide Hi-Hat Stand
Tama 1st Chair Ergo-Rider Drum Throne
Other
Vater 5B Drumsticks

Discography

Evisceration 
Fondling the Dead (demo, 1992)

Lethargy 

It's Hard to Write with a Little Hand (1996) – drums

Gaylord 

Sparkling Cool (1998)

Today is the Day 

In the Eyes of God (1999) – drums
Live Till You Die (2000) – drums

Mastodon 

Remission (2002) – drums
Leviathan (2004) – drums
Blood Mountain (2006) – drums, backing vocals
Crack the Skye (2009) – drums, percussions, vocals
The Hunter (2011) – drums, percussions, vocals
Once More 'Round the Sun (2014) – drums, percussion, vocals
Emperor of Sand (2017) – drums, percussion, vocals, bass guitar, keyboards
Hushed and Grim (2021) – drums, vocals

Arcadea 

Arcadea (2017) – drums, percussion, vocals

Dark Nights: Metal 

 "Red Death" (2018) – writer, drums, vocals, percussions, bass guitar

References

External links

Living people
1975 births
American heavy metal drummers
Musicians from Georgia (U.S. state)
Musicians from Rochester, New York
Today Is the Day members
Progressive metal musicians
Mastodon (band) members
20th-century American drummers
American male drummers
21st-century American drummers
20th-century American male musicians
21st-century American male musicians